Creemore is a former village, now part of Clearview Township, located in Simcoe County, Ontario, Canada. It sits on the eastern boundary of the Niagara Escarpment. 

Creemore purportedly has North America's smallest jail. Coboconk and Tweed make similar claims of their jails.

History
The settlement of Creemore began in 1842 and by the turn of the century it was a thriving village of about 800 people with a vibrant business community.

In 1993, the amalgamation of Sunnidale, Nottawasaga, Village of Creemore and Town of Stayner took place and it became Clearview Township.

Before explorers arrived in the early 17th century, indigenous people lived in the general area of Creemore. Some of these native tribes included: Petun, Wyandot (Wendat), Iroquois, and Algonquin. Soon, early white explorers arrived to trade with these native tribes. Along with the arrival of the explorers, English civilization was soon imported into the area that we now know as Creemore.

French explorer Samuel de Champlain first visited the Creemore area in 1616 to promote trade with the Petun, a First Nations tribe. He was the first to write a description of the area: “The country is full of hill-slopes and little level stretches, which make it a pleasant country.”

Creemore's name and town origins have strong Irish roots – the name is derived from the Irish “cron mor,” which means “big heart” and it was the village's founder, Irish entrepreneur Edward Webster who coined the name in the year 1845. He paid tribute to his family by naming the original streets after them: Elizabeth (for his wife and daughter), Francis and Wellington (for his sons), and Alice and William (for his parents).

Historical signs are scattered around Creemore that explain more about the town's history. If you ever visit Creemore, it is advised that you read the signs if you are interested in the historical features of Creemore.

In Creemore, there are many historical sites that are quite interesting to look at.

Some of these sites include:
Four old churches there were constructed sometime before the 20th century
An old school that was constructed in the early 20th century - was no longer used as an educational site by 2013
Old bridge at the south end of Collingwood Street that was constructed in the 20th century - was revived in 2016 with new materials, with the shape and style of the bridge still remaining the same.

Economy

Creemore has a vibrant small business community and is the home to Creemore Springs Brewery. The microbrewery was acquired by Molson on April 22, 2005.
Each year the Copper Kettle festival attracts thousands, closing the entire main street with activities and antique automobile displays, bands, Farm animals and many other attractions for young and old.

References 

Communities in Simcoe County
Former villages in Ontario